Lingaraj Valyal is an Indian politician from the Bharatiya Janata Party, Maharashtra who served as Lok Sabha member from Solapur from 1996 to 1998. He had also represented Solapur City North from 1990 to 1996.

References 

Living people
Bharatiya Janata Party politicians from Maharashtra
Maharashtra MLAs 1990–1995
1950 births
People from Solapur
India MPs 1996–1997